Tridge or The Tridge may refer to:

 A three-way bridge
 The Tridge (Midland, Michigan), a three-way footbridge in Midland, Michigan
 The Tridge (Ypsilanti, Michigan), a three-way footbridge in Ypsilanti, Michigan
 Andrew Tridgell, or 'Tridge' (born 1967), Australian computer programmer

See also 
 Trige